The Kings of Sport (French: Les rois du sport) is a 1937 French comedy film directed by Pierre Colombier and starring Raimu, Fernandel and Jules Berry.

It was made at the Billancourt Studios in Paris. The film's sets were designed by the art director Jacques Colombier. The football scenes were shot at the Stade de l'Huveaune home of Olympique Marseille, who were the reigning champions of France at the time.

Synopsis
Two waiters from Marseille become involved in the world of sports organisation and gambling.

Cast

References

Bibliography 
 Philippe Rège. Encyclopedia of French Film Directors, Volume 1. Scarecrow Press, 2009.

External links 
 

1937 films
1930s sports comedy films
French sports comedy films
1930s French-language films
Films directed by Pierre Colombier
Films set in Marseille
Films set in Paris
Films shot in Marseille
French boxing films
French association football films
Films shot at Billancourt Studios
1937 comedy films
1930s French films